Petri Ylönen (born October 2, 1962 in Helsinki, Finland) is a Finnish born French former professional ice hockey goaltender who played in the French national ice hockey team.

Playing career

Early career
Petri Ylönen started his career in Finnish First Division team TuTo, which is based in Turku. Ylönen was raised by Karhu-Kissat.

Career in France
Ylönen moved to HC Briançon in 1987 and spent two seasons, playing for the team. After Briançon, Ylönen moved to Rouen HE, where he won five Ligue Magnus-championships. He received 5 times the Jean Ferrand Trophy as best goaltender in the league.

Move to Germany and retirement
Ylönen played his last two seasons in Germany, where he played for Augsburger Panther.

Ylönen retired in 1998.

Return
After retiring, Ylönen moved to live near Toulouse.

Ylönen made a two-season return to ice hockey as he played for Division 2 team Toulouse BHC from 2000 to 2002.

International career
Petri Ylönen is a French National and played 150 games for the French national ice hockey team.

Ylönen played six times in the Ice Hockey World Championships: 1991 Pool B Yugoslavia, 1992 Czechoslovakia, 1993 Germany, 1994 Italy, 1995 Sweden, 1996 Austria, and twice in the Winter Olympics, Albertville 1992 and Lillehammer 1994.

References

External links

1962 births
Ice hockey people from Helsinki
Augsburger Panther players
Diables Rouges de Briançon players
Finnish ice hockey goaltenders
Ice hockey players at the 1992 Winter Olympics
Ice hockey players at the 1994 Winter Olympics
Living people
Olympic ice hockey players of France
Rouen HE 76 players
TuTo players
Naturalized citizens of France
Finnish emigrants to France
Finnish expatriate ice hockey players in Germany
Finnish expatriate ice hockey players in France
French expatriate sportspeople in Germany
French expatriate ice hockey people